Davide Tucci is a Maltese-Italian actor and model, winner of Best Male Photo-model Award 2010 and 2011 at the Malta Fashion Awards. He was born on 14 September 1987 in Isola del Liri to an Italian father and a Maltese mother. Later his family moved to the Maltese Islands. He attended St Aloysius College.

Tucci started out in musical theatre with Spring Awakening and later started a career in modelling which earned him two consecutive awards at the Malta Fashion Awards in 2010 and 2011.

Soon, he gained more popularity in Malta due to his TV roles as Clyde Montaldo in Katrina, and that of Alex Mamo on Ic-Caqqufa, both television series' on Maltese National Television. He later on starred as Brimbu on the Maltese television thriller series Division 7 (ongoing series) on Malta's ONE TV. Davide Tucci also plays John Camilleri in Limestone Cowboy, one of the first indigenous feature films coming out of the Maltese Islands; Dangerous Arrangement, directed by Mario Philip Azzopardi and produced by eOne Canada; and 13 Hours: The Secret Soldiers of Benghazi.

Tucci is also a stage actor who has performed in such plays as Jiena Nhobb, Inti Thobb, Marti Martek, Martek Marti at the National Theatre of Malta; Faith, Hope u Charity performed at Fort St. Elmo as part of the Malta Arts Festival; William Shakespeare's A Midsummer Night's Dream, performed at the presidential palace's gardens.; and also worked in the acclaimed Maltese cabaret musical Balzunetta Towers, a show which sold out soon after its premiere, part of the 2017 Malta International Arts Festival programme, created by some of the most prominent Maltese artists such as Alfred Sant (dialogue), Dominic Galea (music) and Albert Marshall (lyrics). In 2020, he also starred in the iconic role of Jack Worthing in Oscar Wilde's The Importance Of Being Earnest, at the National Theatre of Malta - to date, this has been his last role on stage.

Among many other TV, print and radio interviews, Tucci has been featured in 2016 by Lino Mallia on Platea; he is the youngest actor to date to be interviewed on the program.

Filmography

References

External links
Official Website

St Aloysuis College Notable Alumni

1987 births
Living people
Maltese male film actors
Maltese male stage actors
Maltese male television actors
Maltese people of Italian descent
21st-century Italian male actors
Italian male film actors
Italian male musical theatre actors
Italian male stage actors
Italian people of Maltese descent
Italian male models
People of Lazian descent